Palmira is a district of the Carrillo canton, in the Guanacaste province of Costa Rica.

History

Geography 
Palmira has an area of  km² and an elevation of  metres.

Villages
Administrative center of the district is the village of Palmira.

Other villages in the district are Ángeles, Comunidad, Paso Tempisque (partly) and San Rafael.

Demographics 

For the 2011 census, Palmira had a population of  inhabitants.

Transportation

Road transportation 
The district is covered by the following road routes:
 National Route 21
 National Route 151
 National Route 253
 National Route 254
 National Route 912

References 

Districts of Guanacaste Province
Populated places in Guanacaste Province